Jukebox is a studio album from Canadian rock musicians Randy Bachman and Burton Cummings, performing together under the name "The Bachman-Cummings Band". It was released on Sony BMG on June 12, 2007.  The album features cover versions of songs from the 1960s that Bachman and Cummings listened to while growing up in Winnipeg, Manitoba. Bachman and Cummings are backed on the album by the Canadian band The Carpet Frogs.

Track listing
"Baby Come Back" – (Eddy Grant) – 2:42
"Who Do You Love?" – (Ellas McDaniel) – 5:07
"I'm Happy Just to Dance with You" – (Lennon/McCartney) – 3:55
"The Walk" – (Jimmy McCrackin) – 3:15
"Don't Talk to Him" – (Cliff Richard, Bruce Welch) – 2:55
"Man of Mystery" – (Michael Carr) – 2:06
"Ain't That Just Like a Woman" – (Claude Demetrius, Fleecie Moore) – 3:05
"Little Queenie" – (Chuck Berry) – 4:18
"Good Times" – (Sam Cooke) – 2:40
"Like a Rolling Stone" – (Bob Dylan) – 6:20
"Judy in Disguise (With Glasses)" – (Andrew Bernard, John Fred) – 2:56
"Don't You Just Know It" – (Huey "Piano" Smith) – 4:09
"Yeh, Yeh" – (Jon Hendricks, Rodgers Grant, Pat Patrick) – 2:55
"Agent Double-O Soul" – (Charles Hatcher, Bill Sharpley) – 3:07
"The Letter" – (Wayne Carson Thompson) – 4:02
"Ain't That Loving You Baby" – (Ivory Joe Hunter, Clyde Otis) – 2:35
"American Woman 2007" – (Randy Bachman, Burton Cummings, Jim Kale, Garry Peterson) – 4:43

2007 albums
Bachman & Cummings albums
Randy Bachman albums
Covers albums
Sony BMG albums
Albums recorded at Metalworks Studios